Pierre Authier is a French car designer known for the Peugeot 208 and the urban cross-over Peugeot 2008. Award Rising Star Designer by Automotive News in 2014.

After studying at the Art Center College of Design in Vevey in Switzerland, he joined Peugeot in 1997.

He was the head of design for the Peugeot 208 presented in 2011, and which was seen by some commentators as a landmark in Peugeot design.

He designed the Peugeot 208 XY and 208 GTi, which were both unveiled at the Geneva Motor Show in March 2012. He was the design manager for the 307, 308, 508 and EX1 Concept.

References

External links
  208 design
  Peugeot 208 website
  Peugeot 208 design story
  Peugeot 208 GTi

Year of birth missing (living people)
French automobile designers
Living people
Peugeot people